Richard Robert Latessa (September 15, 1929 – December 19, 2016) was an American stage, film, and television actor.

Early life
Latessa was born in Cleveland, Ohio in 1929. After serving in the Army in maybe 1952, he began performing in Cleveland before moving to New York in 1959 to pursue acting professionally.

Stage career
He made his Broadway debut in The Education of H*Y*M*A*N K*A*P*L*A*N in 1968. His subsequent theatre credits include Follies, Rags, The Cherry Orchard, Damn Yankees, A Funny Thing Happened on the Way to the Forum, Awake and Sing!, Cabaret, The Will Rogers Follies and Hairspray, for which he won both the Tony- and Drama Desk awards for Best Featured Actor in a Musical. In 2012, he appeared opposite Linda Lavin in the Nicky Silver drama, The Lyons.

Latessa was featured in several Neil Simon plays, including Chapter Two, I Ought to Be in Pictures, Brighton Beach Memoirs, Broadway Bound, Rumors and Proposals. He was featured in the 2010 revival of the Burt Bacharach and Hal David musical, Promises, Promises as Dr. Dreyfuss.

Film and television career
Latessa's screen credits include The Substance of Fire, Alfie, and Stigmata. He appeared in numerous television movies, including Izzy and Moe, The Trial of Bernhard Goetz, and Pudd'nhead Wilson, and such primetime series as Get Smart, Mission: Impossible, Ironside, Spenser: For Hire, The Sopranos, Ed, and Law & Order. He is widely known as the second and most recognized actor to play Noel Douglas on The Edge of Night.  He later played Neil Hayes on One Life to Live.

Death
Latessa died on December 19, 2016 of heart failure in New York City, aged 87.

Filmography

Awards and nominations

References

External links
 
 
 
 TonyAwards.com Interview with Dick Latessa
 Dick Latessa at Find a Grave

1929 births
2016 deaths
American male film actors
American male television actors
American male musical theatre actors
Burials at Lake View Cemetery, Cleveland
Drama Desk Award winners
Male actors from Cleveland
Tony Award winners